Opar or OPAR may refer to:

 Opar (fictional city), a fictional lost city in Edgar Rice Burroughs's series of Tarzan novels
 Opar (state constituency), a state constituency of Malaysia
 Opar, Albania
 OPAR L'Orientale Open Archive, the institutional repository of the University of Naples, Italy
 Objectivism: The Philosophy of Ayn Rand, a book by Leonard Peikoff
 GTRI Office of Policy Analysis and Research, a think tank at the Georgia Tech Research Institute

See also